In the mathematical field of Riemannian geometry, every submanifold of a Riemannian manifold has a surface area. The first variation of area formula is a fundamental computation for how this quantity is affected by the deformation of the submanifold. The fundamental quantity is to do with the mean curvature. 

Let  denote a Riemannian manifold, and consider an oriented smooth manifold  (possibly with boundary) together with a one-parameter family of smooth immersions  of  into . The first variation of area refers to the computation

Via Cartan's magic formula, this term can also be written as the Lie derivative of the volume form relative to the tangential projection.

In that case it is immediate from Stokes' theorem that

In many contexts,  is a closed manifold or the variation vector field is every orthogonal to the submanifold. In either case, the second term automatically vanishes. In such a situation, the mean curvature vector is seen as entirely governing how the surface area of a submanifold is modified by a deformation of the surface. In particular, the vanishing of the mean curvature vector is seen as being equivalent to submanifold being a critical point of the volume functional. This shows how a minimal submanifold can be characterized either by the critical point theory of the volume functional or by an explicit partial differential equation for the immersion.

The special case of the first variation formula arising when  is an interval on the real number line is particularly well-known. In this context, the volume functional is known as the length functional and its variational analysis is fundamental to the study of geodesics in Riemannian geometry.

References
 
 
 
 

Riemannian geometry